Newlyweds: The First Year is an American reality television series that premiered on May 6, 2013, on Bravo. The series chronicles the lives of four newly married couples from across the country. It follows the duos from their actual wedding day until their one-year anniversary, highlighting everything that occurs in between. None of the couples ever meet but viewers see the commonalities between their married lives. On October 7, 2013, the series was renewed for a second season. In April 2014, Bravo announced the third season renewal with both seasons airing in late 2014 and 2015. However, Bravo later pushed the premiere date and the second season premiered on March 10, 2015. The number of episodes was increased from eight to ten.

Cast

Season 1

Kimberly V. Cherebin and Alaska Gedeon
Kimberly is a celebrity stylist from the Bronx, while Alaska works as a director of Artist and Repertoire at Warner Bros. Records and is from Brooklyn; the couple now lives in Harlem, NY. The duo bounce between Los Angeles and New York City as they balance their marriage and careers. Kim dreams of starting a family in Harlem but Alaska's business prevents them from doing that. Alaska and Kim's religious beliefs provide them with a strong balance.

Jeff Pedersen and Blair Late
Blair and Jeff were introduced to each other at a mutual friend's pool party. After almost a year of dating, the couple entered a domestic partnership in Savannah, Georgia. Jeff and Blair visit a sex therapist to address a large gap in their sex drives and other issues associated with their 16-year age difference, contrasting careers, and minor personality clashes. Blair is a former European pop star and current entertainment reporter, while Jeff works as a federal investigator.

Tina Sugandh and Tarz Ludwigsen
Tina is an Indian international pop star, and Tarz is president/co-founder of a start-up Internet company, Pandoodle. While the couple have successful careers, they find it challenging to find time together, which they hope to change with marriage. Tarz also finds himself clashing with Tina's father, who follows traditional Indian values. After dating for four years, they married in December 2011. After suffering a miscarriage, their son was born six week premature in June 2013. They also have a daughter named Song Sugandh born in July 2015.

Kathryn Bougadis and John Lagoudes
Kathryn left her steady job and city lifestyle after she wed John just six months after they met. Soon after they were pregnant; their son Dean James Lagoudes was born September 24, 2012. The couple now reside in the suburbs and own a Long Island tanning salon.

Season 2

Laura Leigh Abby and Samantha Abby
Sam is the owner of her own production company, Penny Lane Pictures, while Laura is a writer. They live in New York City.

Erik Courtney and Nadine Jolie Courtney
Nadine is a beauty/travel blogger and author of books Beauty Confidential and Confessions of a Beauty Addict, and Erik is an IT consultant and filmmaker. They live in Santa Monica, California with their daughter Aurelia.

Kirk Knight and Laura Knight
Laura is the owner of an insurance brokerage company and is a Pilates instructor, and Kirk is the owner of his own commercial real estate investment company as well as an Internet startup. They live in Bethesda, Maryland.

Rouvaun Walker and Toi Troutman-Walker
Rouvaun is a mortgage banker, and Toi, who owns a hair extension line called Renown Hair, is a former celebrity publicist. They live in Hayward, California.

Season 3
 Rochelle and Rob Brann
 Erica and Adonis Gladney
 Brandon Liberati and Craig Ramsay
 Tara and Rob Radcliffe

Episodes

Series overview

Season 1 (2013)

Season 2 (2015)

Season 3 (2016)

References

External links

 
 
 

2010s American reality television series
2013 American television series debuts
2016 American television series endings
English-language television shows
Bravo (American TV network) original programming